Neophytos of Cyprus, Saint Neophytos, Neophytos the Recluse (Greek: Άγιος Νεόφυτος ο Έγκλειστος; 1134–1214) was a Cypriot Orthodox monk, priest, and sometime hermit, whose writings preserved a history of the early crusades. "He is considered to be one of the most significant figures of the Church of Cyprus"

Life
Neophytos was born in the mountain village of Kato Drys near Pano Lefkara, Cyprus, to farming parents Athanasios and Eudoxia, one of eight children. His religious interests came to the fore when the arranged marriage planned by his parents ended with his fleeing to the Monastery of Saint John Chrysostomos in Koutsovendis. After much ado, the marriage contracts were broken and Neophytos went back to the monastery as a novice, becoming a tonsured monk in 1152.  During this time he learned to read and write and was eventually appointed as assistant sacristan.  Although Neophytos felt called to be a hermit, his abbot declined to let him go, citing his youth.

In 1158, however, Neophytos was allowed to make a pilgrimage to the Holy Land. While he was there he sought out hermits who might sponsor him, but to no avail. He returned to Cyprus, but still wanted to pursue the hermitic life.  He tried to escape to Mt. Latmos in Asia Minor, but was arrested at Paphos upon his attempted embarkation. He was shortly released from prison, but the guards had stolen his travel funds, so, in June 1159, he went to the hilly area above Paphos, where he found a cave that had been used by a previous hermit. He enlarged the space, eventually creating three caves known today as the Cell, the Bema and the Naos. Neophytos's life as a hermit attracted the religious in the area who brought him food and gifts.  His air of sanctity brought many to visit him, and in 1170 Vasilios (Basil) Kinnamos, the Bishop of Paphos, ordained him as a priest and required him to take a disciple, which started the monastery which now bears his name.

Neophytos wrote a chronicle titled Περὶ τῶν κατὰ χώραν Κύπρον σκαιῶν (On the calamities against the country of Cyprus) dated to 1196, which is one of the few Greek primary sources that record the events of the Third Crusade in Cyprus and the pursuit of the Byzantine ruler of Cyprus, Isaakios Komninos by the English king Richard the Lionheart. Neophytos takes a judgmental stance against the crusaders and his chronicle is anti-Latin.

Legacy
Saint Neophytos Monastery was named in his honor.

Publication history 

 Σάθας, K. Μεσαιωνική Βιβλιοθήκη Τόμος Β΄. Χρονογράφοι Βασιλείου Κύρπου. Εν Βενετία: Τύποις του Χρόνου (1873).

See also 

 Kingdom of Cyprus
 Leontios Machairas
 Georgios Boustronios

Notes

Further reading
 Coureas, Nicholas (2003) The foundation rules of medieval Cypriot monasteries: Makhairas and St. Neophytos Cyprus Research Centre, Nicosia, Cyprus, 
 Englezakis, Benedict (1995) Studies on the History of the Church of Cyprus, 4th–20th Centuries (translated from Modern Greek by Norman Russell) Variorum, Aldershot, Hampshire, England, 
 Epstein, Ann Wharton (1981) "Formulas for Salvation: A Comparison of Two Byzantine Monasteries and their Founders" Church History 50(4): pp. 385–400, 
 Galatariotou, Catia (2002) The Making of a Saint: The Life, Times and Sanctification of Neophytos the Recluse Cambridge University Press, Cambridge, England, 
 Mango, C. A. and Hawkins, E. J. W. (1966) "The Hermitage of St. Neophytos and Its Wall Paintings" Dumbarton Oaks Papers 20: pp. 119–206
 Papageōrgiou, Athanasios (1998) The Monastery of Agios Neophytos: History and Art (a short guide) Holy Royal and Stavropegiac Monastery of Saint Neophytos, Nicosia, Cyprus, 
 Tsiknopoullos, Ioannis P. (1965) The Encleistra and Saint Neophytos Zavallis Press, Leukosia, Cyprus, 

Eastern Orthodox saints
13th-century Christian saints
Cypriot saints
People from Larnaca District
1134 births
1214 deaths
13th-century Eastern Orthodox priests
12th-century Eastern Orthodox priests
12th-century Byzantine monks
Orthodox Christian Chroniclers
Cypriot historians
Eastern Orthodox Christians from Cyprus
People of the Kingdom of Cyprus
12th-century writers
13th-century writers
Cypriot non-fiction writers